Federico Colonna (born 17 August 1972) is an Italian former professional road racing cyclist.

Major results

1992
 2nd Circuito del Porto
1993
 1st Circuito del Porto
1994
 1st Stage 4 Vuelta a Murcia
 1st Stage 2 Vuelta a Castilla y León
 1st Stage 3 Herald Sun Tour
1995
 1st Overall Clásica de Alcobendas
 1st Stage 2 Four Days of Dunkirk
 1st Stages 2, 4 & 5 Vuelta a Castilla y León
1996
 1st Stage 1 Ronde van Nederland
 1st Trofeo Manacor
 1st Stage 2 Circuit de la Sarthe
 1st Stage 2 Tour de Pologne
 1st Stage 8 Tour DuPont
 3rd Paris–Camembert
 3rd Trofeo Alcudia
 5th Clásica de Almería
1997
 1st Gran Premio Città di Rio Saliceto e Correggio
1998
 1st Stages 3 & 5 Volta a la Comunitat Valenciana
 1st Gran Premio Città di Rio Saliceto e Correggio
2001
 1st Stage 12 Tour de Langkawi

Grand Tour general classification results timeline

References

1972 births
Living people
People from Fucecchio
Italian male cyclists
Sportspeople from the Metropolitan City of Florence
Cyclists from Tuscany